The 2011–12 Segunda División de Fútbol Femenino was the 21st edition of the second category of the Spanish women's football national championship. The competition was renamed, having been previously known as Primera Nacional, and a seventh group was created; the groups were rearranged and redistributed by regions as shown in the table below. The promotion play-offs were consequently expanded from six to eight teams, and held as two single-match rounds instead of two triangulars. Sevilla FC and FC Levante Las Planas were promoted after beating CD Femarguín and UD Tacuense in the final stage, held on May 26 – 27, 2012. The regular stage ran from September 24, 2011 to April 29, 2012.

Group 1

Teams by autonomous community

Table

Group 2

Teams by autonomous community

Table

Group 3

Teams by autonomous community

Table

Group 4

Teams by autonomous community

Table

Group 5

Teams by autonomous community

Table

Group 6

Teams by autonomous community

Table

Group 7

Teams by autonomous community

Table

Promotion play-offs

First round

Final Round

Sevilla FC is promoted to the 2012-13 Primera División

FC Levante Las Planas is promoted to the 2012-13 Primera División

References

Spa
2
Women2
Segunda División (women) seasons